The Bali Marathon (also known as the Maybank Marathon or Maybank Bali Marathon) is an annual road-based marathon hosted in the Gianyar Regency on the island of Bali in Indonesia.  The current version of the marathon has been held since 2012, although the first marathon to be held regularly on Bali was inaugurated in 1999.  The marathon is a World Athletics Elite Label Road Race and a member of the Association of International Marathons and Distance Races.

History

Initial era 

A total of 147 runners participated in the event, which included a half marathon and a 10K run.

References

External links 
 Official website

2012 establishments in Indonesia
Annual sporting events in Indonesia
Athletics competitions in Indonesia
August sporting events
Marathons in Asia
Recurring sporting events established in 2012
September sporting events
Sport in Bali